The 3 Day Theory is the ninth solo studio album by rapper Killah Priest, released August 3, 2010 through Man Bites Dog Records. The album was produced entirely by Kount Fif.

The 3 Day Theory features guest appearances from artists such as Cappadonna, The Last Emperor, Sabac Red and Canibus.

Track listing 
 "Book of Life"
 "Shadows"
 "Betrayal" (feat. Cappadonna)
 "Brolic" (feat. Empuls)
 "Priest History"
 "Fire Reign" (feat. Copywrite & Jakki Da Motamouth)
 "The Destroyer" (feat. Empuls, Sonsee, Steven King & iCON The Mic King)
 "Birds" (feat. Jay-Notes & Redd Mudd & Scratch Johnson AKA DJ Drastic Ohio on the cuts)
 "Democracy" (feat. Canibus)
 "Outer Body Experience"
 "Psalm of Satan" (feat. Ill Bill & Sabac Red)
 "The Rose" (feat. Lyrik)
 "Circles" (feat. 2Mex & The Last Emperor)
 "Words from a Viking"
 "When I Speak" (feat. Mr. Probz & Ras Kass) (iTunes bonus track)

Album Art Director: RML /
Album Artwork done by Orign of Futprnts Workshop

References 

Killah Priest albums
2010 albums